Glenluce station was a station open in 1862 on the former Port Road that was constructed on the Portpatrick and Wigtownshire Joint Railway.

It served the town of Glenluce and provided a strategic link between London Euston and the West Coast Main Line via Carlisle Citadel along the Castle Douglas and Dumfries Railway followed the Portpatrick and Wigtownshire Railway to the port at Stranraer for the ferries to Larne Harbour.

It was closed under the Beeching Axe in 1965.

References

Disused railway stations in Dumfries and Galloway
Former Portpatrick and Wigtownshire Joint Railway stations
Railway stations in Great Britain opened in 1862
Railway stations in Great Britain closed in 1965
Beeching closures in Scotland
1862 establishments in Scotland